The Oil Pourer is a lost Greek bronze of an athlete variously associated with the circle of Lysippos, c. 340-330 BCE, of which Roman marble copies exist, notably in the Glyptothek, Munich (illustration) and in the Albertinum, Dresden. Another well-known Roman replica is conserved at Petworth House. There is a head of this type at the Boston Museum of Fine Arts. 
The Oil Pourer is similar in proportions and manner to the Lysippean Agias of which there is a Roman marble copy at Delphi.

The athlete is represented pouring oil from a flask held high in his (missing) right hand into the (missing) palm of his left. The theme is represented on Attic vase-painting and in freely reinterpreted cast terracotta miniatures.

The Munich sculpture was treated in the 19th century with acid to clean it, which has dissolved about 2mm off its surfaces.

Notes
 

Roman copies of 4th-century BC Greek sculptures